Malacca Chinese High School is a secondary school located at Malim Road in Malacca. Its native Malay name is Sekolah Menengah Jenis Kebangsaan Tinggi Cina Melaka.

History 
The school was founded on 15 February 1960, and only has 40 students in total at the time. 2 January 1961, the school moved to 28, Malim Road. The land was bought and donated it to the school as the school ground, and the name of the school was changed to Malacca Chinese High School. On 15 January 1962, a school building consisting nine classrooms and an office was completed. In the same year, it was reorganized into a national secondary school, which was renamed Sekolah Menengah Kebangsaan Tinggi Cina Melaka. On 15 September 2011, the school held a banquet to celebrate the completion of the large-scale construction project and the opening ceremony of the Gan Boon Leong Hall.

References 

Secondary schools in Malaysia
Schools in Malacca
1960 establishments in Malaya
Educational institutions established in 1960
Chinese-language schools in Malaysia
Publicly funded schools in Malaysia